The Australian pratincole (Stiltia isabella) is a species of bird in the family Glareolidae. It breeds in Australia's interior; it winters to northern and eastern parts of the continent, Indonesia and New Guinea.
It is a medium-sized nomadic shorebird which is commonly found in arid inland Australia. It breeds predominantly from south-western Queensland to northern Victoria and through central Australia to the Kimberley region in Western Australia.
The Australian population is estimated at 60,000 individuals. They are a migratory species that generally move to the southern parts of their distribution range to breed during spring and summer. During winter they migrate to northern Australia, New Guinea, Java, Sulawesi and southern Borneo to over-winter. Although they are common, their occurrence is unpredictable and varies in location.

Taxonomy
The Australian pratincole belongs to the family Glareolidae. It is monotypic within the genus Stiltia.

Other common names
Pratincole, Arnhem Land grouse, Australian courser, roadrunner (not to be confused with the genus of North American cuckoos Geococcyx), nankeen plover, swallow-plover.

Description
The Australian pratincole is a medium-sized slender shorebird with long legs, long pointed wings and a short decurved bill.
 
The sexes look alike however their breeding and non-breeding plumage differs.

Breeding plumage – The head, neck, breast and upperparts are a sandy brown grading. The wings are pointed and black and there is a black loral strip. The chin and throat are white and the breast is a sandy brown. The bill is bright red with a black base and the iris is dark brown. Legs and feet are grey to black.

Non-breeding plumage – This plumage is not well known as there are also effects from seasonal and individual variation. The loral stripe is fainter than when in breeding plumage and the base of the bill is paler. The upperparts are grey-brown with sandy-buff fringes.  Sometimes there are dark flecks at the borders of the pale throat.

Juvenile – The plumage is similar to a non-breeding adult but a slightly paler sandy brown colour. The lores lack the black colour and the forehead, crown and nape are streaked dark brown. The bill is grey-black with a faint reddish base.

In flight – The upperbody and inner wing are sandy brown with black on the outer wing. The tail is square-cut with the upper-tail coverts and sides of the tail white.

The Australian pratincole is slightly slimmer and smaller in size with longer legs than oriental pratincole (Glareola maldivarum). Juveniles with worn plumage and birds in non-breeding plumage could also be confused with the oriental pratincole

Habitat and distribution
The habitat of the Australian pratincole is treeless, open and sparse wooded plains, grasslands, claypans and gibberstone. Most of these areas are usually in arid and semi-arid rainfall zones. They are also sometimes found around the margins of wetlands, creeks, river beds, bore drains, lagoons, springs, claypans and sewage farms. During the breeding season they need scattered low shrubland as the chicks use the shrubs to hide and shelter in.

Behaviour and ecology

Diet
Their diet consists of mainly insects, spiders and centipedes. Insects are caught either hawking in the air or pecked from the ground's surface. When foraging on the ground they stalk their prey, then dart forward with sometimes one wing outspread to catch the prey. They actively forage during the day with peak periods at dawn and dusk. 
They require drinking water because they thermoregulate by evaporation from the mouth. As they have salt glands, both saline and ephemeral water can be drunk.

Breeding
They are a monogamous species with pairs staying together during the breeding season. They usually lay 2 eggs on the bare ground in a scrape. Sometimes in a dry season, only one egg is laid. The scrape can be on stony ground and if the ground is soft they will make a small depression. The nests are sometimes ringed with small stones or sheep droppings. They are sometimes lined with small pebbles, dry plant material or rabbit droppings. 
The eggs are light cream to stony brown in colour with short wavy streaks and irregularly shaped with spots of brownish black intermingled with smaller under lying bluish-grey evenly distributed markings. Approximate egg measurement is 31mm x 24mm. 
Both sexes have been observed to incubate the eggs and care for the chicks. The young are semi-precocial. The downy young are sandy buff with black markings. At approximately 10 days feathers start to appear and at 3 weeks of age they are fully feathered with similar colouration to that of a non-breeding adult.  The parents continue to feed the young until they are able to fly at 4–5 weeks of age.

Migration
They are known to gather in flocks to migrate, and calls heard continuously within the flock.

Sexual behaviour/courtship
When they first arrive in the breeding grounds they appear to already be paired.  At this time, the birds appear to be maintaining their bonds and possibly entering into courtship rituals. It appears that the nest site selection is part of the pair-bond ritual with both sexes involved equally. They have been observed running to a spot where one sits down and shuffles its belly and throws small objects sideways. The mate watches, then selects another spot and repeats the ritual.

Family group relations
After hatching, the chicks are led by the parents to nearby cover or refuge. Some chicks however do stay in the nest for one day. The chicks then run out to be fed, probably in response to calls by the parents.

Distraction displays
The Australian pratincole has a repertoire of displays to distract threats, including;
False-brooding
Low flight skimming tops of shrubs
Wings held vertically upwards
Injury-feigning display away from intruder, showing black and white tail pattern
Injury-feigning display towards intruder
Darting about or jumping 20 cm in the air ritualising feeding patterns with or without both wings partly spread.
Non-vocal sounds- during intense distraction displays, the wings are beaten loudly on the ground accompanied by an intense alarm call.

Voice
The Australian pratincole are known to call during summer thunderstorms. The calls are sweet or plaintive whistles or very soft and muted, trills and loud sharp notes. No differences in calls between males and females have been identified. 
Four different types of calls have been clearly identified:
Calls are usually a series of 3-4 rapid repeated notes and varying in length with the tone rising then falling rapidly.
 Far-contact call — plaintive down-slurred . This call is used between mates from the ground near nest and also used to call chicks.
 Greeting call — gently trilled  or short phrase  which is used during courtship display and when flying to mate.
Accompanied at times by distraction displays.

References

Stiltia
Birds of Australia
Birds described in 1816
Taxonomy articles created by Polbot
Taxa named by Louis Jean Pierre Vieillot